María Celeste is a Venezuelan telenovela written by Valentina Párraga and produced by Venevisión in 1994. The series lasted for 152 episodes and was distributed internationally by Venevisión International.

Sonya Smith and Miguel de León starred as the protagonists with Fedra López as the antagonist.

Synopsis
Maria Celeste is the daughter of Cesar Augusto, a '70s rock musician, and Celina, the beautiful young daughter of Don Patricio Hidalgo de la Torre, a wealthy landowner. After leaving the comforts of home, she finds herself very lonely after her husband's death. Celina dies in a strange accident leaving her daughter with her best friend, Martirio Paniagua. Martirio adopts Maria Celeste as her own and she grows up with her adoptive sister, Irania. While looking for a job, Maria Celeste arrives at the Hidalgo Consortium. By coincidence, she meets her prospective boss, Dr. Santiago Azpurua, who is also Don Patricio's godson. Don Patricio discovers his granddaughter's existence and begins to search for her. When he finds Martirio and the two girls, he brings them to live with him. But Irania manipulates the situation to appear as the heiress and her mother becomes her accomplice unwillingly. Maria Celeste will be the target of doubts and lies, weaving a web of confusion and deceit. After a brief romance with Santiago, they break up after Irania makes believe Maria Celeste is having an affair with Horacio. In her distress, Maria Celeste decides to leave the Hidalgo residence although she is aware of her roots. She arrives at Caribe Lezama's ranch who hires her as his assistant, and makes his fortune available to her so she can plot her revenge. The final showdown will be decisive as Don Patricio discovers the truth and finds Maria Celeste's forgiveness. Santiago calls off his wedding to Irania and sets out to find his true love, Maria Celeste. She, in turn, is engaged to Caribe out of gratitude. But Caribe realizes she does not love him and lets her go so she can be with Santiago. Truth, love, passion, intrigue and lies heavily influence the outcome of this story.

Cast 

 Sonya Smith as María Celeste Paniagua
 Miguel de León as Santiago Azpurua
 Fedra López as Irania Paniagua
 Adolfo Cubas as Horacio
 Aroldo Betancourt as Manaure
 Rafael Briceño as Patricio Hidalgo
 Ernesto Balzi as Tiberio
 Orangel Delfín as Rodolfo
 Mauricio González as Cupertino
 Carolina Motaas Jimena
 Belén Díaz as Martirio Paniagua
 Angélica Arenas as Consuelo
 Ileana Jacquet as Herminia
 Aidita Artigas as Sarita
 Cristina Ovin as Octavia
 Sandra Juhaz as Mariu
 Gaspar González as Manuel
 Jose Ángel Urdaneta as Samario
 Freddy Romero as Isaías
 Diego Acuña as Valladares

Special Appearances
Gabriela Spanic as Celina Hidalgo
Yamandu Acevedo as Doctor Andres
Delia López as Amelia
Luis Malave as Casto
Mónica Rubio as Veronica
Luis Rivas as don Nino
Eduardo Luna as Cesar Augusto
Lotario
Miguel David Díaz as Larry
Gabriel Murati as Chuito
Geronimo Gómez as Malote
Kenya Urbina
Pierangela Napoli

References

External links
María Celeste at Internet Movie Database

1994 telenovelas
1994 Venezuelan television series debuts
1994 Venezuelan television series endings
Venezuelan telenovelas
Spanish-language telenovelas
Venevisión telenovelas
Television shows set in Venezuela